Homero Leite Meira (December 2, 1931 – May 8, 2014) was a Brazilian Roman Catholic bishop.

Ordained to the priesthood in 1955, Leite Meira was appointed bishop of the Diocese of Itabuna in 1978. He was transferred as bishop of the Irecê Diocese in 1980 and resigned in 1983.

Notes

1931 births
2014 deaths
20th-century Roman Catholic bishops in Brazil
Roman Catholic bishops of Irecê
Roman Catholic bishops of Itabuna